Robert Boyer, is a Canadian retired professional wrestler. He wrestled under the ring name, Bobby Bold Eagle for over 10 years in Indianapolis, Indiana under Dick the Bruiser's World Wrestling Association.

Championships and accomplishments
Gulf Coast Championship Wrestling
NWA Mississippi Heavyweight Championship (1 time)
NWA Alabama Heavyweight Championship (2 times)
National Wrestling Alliance
NWA Texas Junior Heavyweight Championship (1 time)
Georgia Championship Wrestling
NWA United States Junior Heavyweight Championship (1 time)

References

External links
Online World of Wrestling profile
CageMatch profile 

20th-century professional wrestlers
Canadian male professional wrestlers
Living people
Year of birth missing (living people)